The Union Bar First Nation is a band government of the Sto:lo people, located near Hope, British Columbia.

Demographics
Number of Band Members: 141

References

Sto:lo governments
First Nations governments in the Lower Mainland